Paul Bowman Popenoe (October 16, 1888 – June 19, 1979) was an American marriage councilor, eugenicist and agricultural explorer. He was an influential advocate of the compulsory sterilization of  mentally ill people and people with mental disabilities, and the father of marriage counseling in the United States.

Biography
Born Paul Bowman Popenoe in Topeka, Kansas, in 1888, he was the son of Marion Bowman Popenoe and Frederick Oliver Popenoe, a pioneer of the avocado industry.  (Popenoe dropped his middle name early in life.)  He moved to California as a teen. After attending Occidental College for two years and Stanford University for his junior year majoring in English with coursework in biology, Popenoe left school to care for his father and worked for several years as a newspaper editor. 

He then worked briefly as an agricultural explorer collecting date specimens in Western Asia and Northern Africa for his father's nursery in California, along with his younger brother, Wilson Popenoe, a horticulturist. His travels received considerable support and interest from the US Department of Agriculture. Paul Popenoe published his first book, Date Growing in the Old World and the New, in 1913.

In the mid-1910s, Popenoe became interested in human breeding and edited the Journal of Heredity from 1913 to 1917, with a special attention to eugenics and social hygiene.

By 1918, Popenoe had become well-established enough to co-author (with Roswell Hill Johnson) a popular college textbook on eugenics (Applied Eugenics, edited by Richard T. Ely), which outlined his vision of a eugenics program that primarily relied on the segregation of "waste humanity" into rural institutions, where they would perform manual labor to offset the cost of their institutionalization. He was opposed to child labor on the belief that banning it would reduce the size of families that he regarded as unfit members of society. Additionally, Applied Eugenics contains a chapter expounding on Popenoe's belief in the racial inferiority of black people.  During World War I, Popenoe was inducted into the officer corps of the US Army. Under the War Department Commission on Training Camp Activities, he was charged with rooting out liquor and prostitution in an effort to reduce the high incidence of venereal disease in US troops.

Popenoe married Betty Stankowitch in New York on 23 August 1920. They remained married until her death on 26 June 1978.

In the mid-1920s, Popenoe began working with E.S. Gosney, a wealthy California financier, and the Human Betterment Foundation to promote eugenic policies in California. In 1909, California had enacted its first compulsory sterilization law to allow for the sterilization of the mentally ill and the mentally retarded in its state psychiatric hospitals. With Popenoe as his scientific workhorse, Gosney intended to study the sterilization work done in California and to use it to advocate sterilization in other parts of the country and in the world at large. That would culminate in a number of works, most prominently their joint-authored Sterilization for Human Betterment: A Summary of Results of 6,000 Operations in California, 1909-1929 in 1929. The work would become a popular text for the advocacy of sterilization, as it purported to be an objective study of the operations in the state and concluded, unsurprisingly, that rigorous programs for the sterilization of the "unfit" were beneficial to all involved, including the sterilized patients. In the 1930s, he served as a member of the American Eugenics Society's board of directors, along with Charles B. Davenport, Henry H. Goddard, Madison Grant, Harry H. Laughlin, and Gosney, among others.

In 1929 he received an honorary Sc.D. degree from Occidental College, which he had attended. Thenceforth, he commonly referred to himself as "Dr. Popenoe". In 1976, Popenoe also received the Auld Lang Syne award from Occidental. Nevertheless, in 2019 after a unanimous vote of its board of trustees on April 26 of that year, Occidental rescinded the honorary Sc.D. degree. Leading up to that vote, Occidental Professor Peter Dreier wrote an opinion article in March 2019 about the college's historical role in eugenics and racism, and 86 percent of the college's faculty then signed a statement urging the board to revoke the degree granted to Popenoe 90 years earlier.

Along with his advocacy of sterilization programs, Popenoe was also interested in using the principles of German and Austrian marriage consultation services for eugenic purposes. Aghast at the divorce rate in US society, Popenoe came to the conclusion that "unfit" families would reproduce out of wedlock, but "fit" families would need to be married to reproduce. With financial help from Gosney, he opened the American Institute of Family Relations in Los Angeles in 1930. It was described in 1960 as "the world's largest and best known marriage-counseling center," with a staff of seventy.

For a while, Popenoe's two major interests, eugenics and marriage counseling, ran in parallel, and he published extensively on both topics. As public interest in eugenics waned, Popenoe focused more of his energies into marriage counseling and during public rejection of eugenics at the end of World War II, with the revelation of the Nazi Holocaust, Popenoe had thoroughly redefined himself as primarily a marriage counselor, which had lost most of its explicit eugenic overtones.  Over time, he became more prominent in the field of counseling.

Popenoe favored a popular, rather than academic, approach. In that vein, he appeared on the Art Linkletter television show for over a decade, and he regularly gave lectures and wrote mainstream articles for the general public. For many years, he had a nationally syndicated newspaper column promoting marriage and family life.  As presented in a 1960 biography, the focus areas of his counseling approach and the American Institute of Family Relations included couples' attitudes towards marriage, preparation (including sexuality education), moral values, a focus on action, and mutual understanding between the sexes.

At the peak of his career, he co-founded and edited Ladies' Home Journal most popular column of all time, "Can This Marriage Be Saved?" In 1960, he co-authored (with Dorothy Disney) the book of the same name. His introduction to the book catalogued some of the statistics of the American Institute of Family Relations over its first 30 years.  Under his direction, the institute gave intensive training to over 300 marriage counselors and shorter courses around the US to over 1500 other people. The caseload averaged about 15,000 consultations per year. From the files of the numerous cases came the material for the "Can This Marriage Be Saved?" book and serial. The institute published a bulletin, "Family Life," monthly or bimonthly for decades.

Given the role of clergy in responding to crisis in families, Popenoe increased focus in training the clergy over many years. That culminated in 1978 with the American Institute of Family Relations creating the Pastoral Psychotherapy Training Program, which offered the Master of Arts in Pastoral Psychotherapy. It was the second offering of a master's degree by the institute.

As Popenoe maintained his traditional values (chastity before marriage), changes in popular culture such as feminism and sexual revolution challenged his approach. At the same time, thought leaders in the helping professions tended more and more to favor self-fulfillment over preservation of the family. That led Popenoe to ally increasingly with religious conservatives even though he was not religious himself.  For example, one of his assistants was James Dobson, who founded Focus on the Family in 1977. In the US society of the third millennium, the approach Popenoe developed to marriage counseling, educational and directive rather than medical or psychological, is becoming fashionable again. In the end, the American Institute of Family Relations turned out to be highly dependent on Popenoe's leadership. It closed in the 1980s, not long after Paul Popenoe's death.

Popenoe died on 19 June 1979 in Miami, Florida.

Archives
Shortly before his death, Popenoe transferred his papers to the University of Wyoming.  In 2002, the American Heritage Center of the University of Wyoming reported the collection Paul Bowman Popenoe Papers, 1874–1991, consisting of 85 cubic feet of material. The archives of the Human Betterment Foundation are in Special Collections at Caltech in Pasadena.

Publications
Books

*

Articles

See also
Eugenics in the United States
Compulsory sterilization
Relationship counseling

References

Further reading
Anton, Mike, "Forced Sterilization Once Seen as Path to a Better World" Los Angeles Times (16 July 2003).
Kline, Wendy, Building a Better Race: Gender, Sexuality, and Eugenics from the Turn of the Century to the Baby Boom (Berkeley: University of California Press, 2001).
Ladd-Taylor, Molly, "Eugenics, Sterilisation, and Modern Marriage in the USA: The Strange Career of Paul Popenoe," in Gender and History, vol. 13, no. 2 (August 2001), 298–327.

External links
 Inventory of the Paul Bowman Popenoe papers at the American Heritage Center, University of Wyoming
 
 

1888 births
1979 deaths
American eugenicists
American health activists
American political activists
Race and intelligence controversy
Relationship counseling
Proponents of scientific racism